Most Ven. Nauyane Ariyadhamma Maha Thera‍ (24 April 1939  – 6 September 2016) was a Sri Lankan bhikkhu (Buddhist monk) and a senior meditation teacher. He was the spiritual advisor of the Sri Kalyani Yogasrama Samstha, and for many years resided at the Na Uyana Aranya. In 2011 he moved to Meetirigala Dharmayatanaya to help revitalize this long-standing place of learning and dhamma practice.

Early life 
Ven. Ariyadhamma Mahathera was born on 24 April 1939 to a traditional Buddhist family in Kurunegala and was educated at the Government School of Nilagama. His father was a supporter of Ven. Wigoda Bodhirakkhita Thera, who was resident at the nearby Na Uyana forest monastery. The close relationship with the monks from childhood inspired his decision to ordain, and he trained under Ven. Wigoda Bodhirakkhita Thera in 1956 as an upasaka. He went forth on 27 March 1957 with Ven. Matara Sri Nanarama Mahathera as his upajjhaya and received upasampada on 15 July 1959 with Ven. Madawala Dhammatilaka Mahathera as the upajjhaya.

Monastic life 
Ven Ariyadhamma thero studied under several learned elders, including Getamanne Sri Vimalavamsa Mahathera, Ven. Kadawedduwe Sri Jinavamsa Mahathera, Ven. Devagoda Mangalasiri Mahathera and Ven. Matara Sri Nanarama Mahathera. He studied the Burmese language from Ven. Nyaninda Sayadaw while he was in Sri Lanka in 1964. 

Ven. Ariyadhamma thero was proficient in Pali and Sanskrit and had extensive knowledge of the Pali Canon and the Pali commentaries. He was a teacher at the Gunawardena Yogasrama (the headquarters of Sri Kalyani Yogasrama Samstha) from 1965 to 1995. Ven Ariyadhamma thero was appointed the registrar of Sri Kalyani Yogasrama Samstha in 1969, a position he held until being appointed the spiritual advisor and head of the organization in 2003. In this capacity, Ariyadhamma led about 1,500 forest monks in 193 branch monasteries.

Meditation practice 
During the 1960s, Ven. Ariyadhamma thero studied the Mahasi meditation system under Ven. Matara Sri Nanarama Mahathera, and was guided in traditional Sri Lankan meditation methods by Ven. Matale Silarakkhita Mahathera of Ruwangirikanda Aranya. He did retreats at Mahasi centres in Burma in 1992 and 1993. 

In 1996, Ariyadhamma practiced under Ven. Sayadaw U Āciṇṇa (Pa-Auk Tawya Sayadaw) at Pa-Auk Meditation Centre in Mawlamyine, Burma. On returning to Sri Lanka in the beginning of 1997, he introduced the method to the Sri Kalyani Yogasrama Samstha, and there are several monasteries in the organization now practicing the Pa-Auk method. Ariyadhamma did further retreats at the same centre in 1997, 2001 and 2010. 

Ariyadhamma taught meditation to monks and lay practitioners since 1977. In 2006, he was awarded the ‘Mahākammaṭṭhānācariya’ (‘Great Meditation Teacher’) title by the Government of the Burma in recognition of his services in teaching Dhamma and meditation.

Awards  
The Sri Lanka Ramanna Nikaya awarded Ariyadhamma the titles of ‘Tripiṭaka Vāgīśvarācārya’ and ‘Mahopādhyāya’. The Government of Burma awarded him the title ‘Mahā Kammaṭṭhānācāriya’.

Publications 
Ariyadhamma has written more than 100 books and booklets in Sinhala on meditation and Dhamma. A few of these have been translated to English.

See also 
 Sri Kalyani Yogasrama Samstha
 Na Uyana Aranya

References

External links 
 English translations of Dhamma talks by Ven. Nauyane Ariyadhamma Mahathera
 Sinhala Dhamma talks by Ven. Nauyane Ariyadhamma Mahathera
 Please follow this link to download Dhamma talks (Courtesy of http://www.ariyamagga.org/)

1939 births
2016 deaths
Monks
Sri Lankan Buddhist monks
Theravada Buddhism writers